Jazz pianist Thelonious Monk's first sessions as a bandleader were recorded between 1947 and 1952, and released on Blue Note records as a series of 78 RPM singles.  These singles were then compiled in later years—with additional performances from the sessions—into long-playing album formats.  As Monk's reputation and fame grew, the sessions were recompiled again and again into more complete configurations.  This article details various releases of these sessions.

The Sessions
The Blue Note recordings were made over the course of six sessions.  "Versions" refers only to the number of eventually-released performances; other takes may have been recorded.

All compositions by Thelonious Monk unless otherwise noted.

Session 1:  October 15, 1947
 "Humph"
 "Evonce" (Idrees Sulieman, Ike Quebec) [2 versions]
 "Suburban Eyes" (Ike Quebec) [2 versions]
 "Thelonious"
recorded at WOR Studios, New York City

Session 2: October 24, 1947
 "Nice Work If You Can Get It" (George Gershwin) [2 versions]
 Ira Gershwin wrote lyrics for this song, but these recordings are instrumental.
 "Ruby, My Dear" [2 versions]
 "Well You Needn't" [2 versions]
 "April in Paris" (Vernon Duke) [2 versions]
 Yip Harburg wrote lyrics for this song, but these recordings are instrumental.
 "Off Minor"
 "Introspection"
recorded at WOR Studios, New York City

Session 3: November 21, 1947
 "In Walked Bud"
 "Monk's Mood"
 "Who Knows? [2 versions]"
 "'Round Midnight"
recorded at WOR Studios, New York City

Session 4: July 2, 1948
 "Evidence"
 "Misterioso" [2 versions]
 "Epistrophy" (Monk, Kenny Clarke)
 "I Mean You"
 "All the Things You Are" (Jerome Kern, Oscar Hammerstein)
 "I Should Care" (Sammy Cahn, Axel Stordahl, Paul Weston) [2 versions]
recorded at Apex Studios, New York City

Session 5: July 23, 1951
 "Four in One" [2 versions]
 "Criss Cross" [2 versions]
 "Eronel" (Monk, Sulieman, Sadik Hakim)
 "Straight, No Chaser"
 "Ask Me Now" [2 versions]
 "Willow Weep for Me" (Ann Ronnell)
recorded at WOR Studios, New York City

Session 6: May 30, 1952
 "Skippy" [2 versions]
 "Hornin' In" [2 versions]
 "Sixteen" [2 versions]
 "Carolina Moon" (Benny Davis, Joe Burke)
 "Let's Cool One"
 "I'll Follow You" (Fred E. Ahlert)
 Roy Turk wrote lyrics for this song, but this recording is instrumental.

recorded at WOR Studios, New York City

Material from this session did not appear on the early 1950s Blue Note 10" LPs, which may indicate that they were recorded after preparation of the last of these albums. "Sixteen" and "I'll Follow You" remained unreleased until the 1980s.

Personnel
Thelonious Monk - piano
Art Blakey - drums (sessions 1, 2, 3, 5)
Shadow Wilson - drums (session 4)
Max Roach - drums (session 6)
Gene Ramey - bass (session 1, 2)
Bob Paige - bass (session 3)
John Simmons - bass (session 4)
Al McKibbon - bass (session 5)
Nelson Boyd - bass (session 6)
Milt Jackson - vibraphone (4, 5)
Idrees Sulieman - trumpet (session 1)
George Taitt - trumpet (session 3)
Kenny Dorham - trumpet (session 6)
Danny Quebec West - alto saxophone (session 1)
Sahib Shihab - alto saxophone (sessions 3, 5)
Lou Donaldson - alto saxophone (session 6)
Billy Smith - tenor saxophone (session 1)
Lucky Thompson - tenor saxophone (session 6)
Kenny "Pancho" Hagood - vocal (session 4, songs 19 & 20)

Singles
Singles released from the Blue Note sessions include the following:

Blue Note 500 series (10 inch 78 rpm)
 BN 542 "Thelonious" (BN311-0) / "Suburban Eyes" (BN310-1)
 BN 543 "'Round About Midnight" (BN321-1) / "Well, You Needn't" (BN314-0)
 BN 547 "Evonce" (BN309-4) / "Off Minor" (BN317-1)
 BN 548 "In Walked Bud" (BN318-3) / "Epistrophy" (BN330-0)
 BN 549 "Ruby, My Dear" (BN313-1) / "Evidence" (BN328-0)
 BN 560 "Humph" (BN308-2) / "Misterioso" (BN329-0)

Blue Note 1200 series (10 inch 78 rpm)
 BN 1201 "I Should Care" (BN327-2) / "All the Things You Are" (BN326-3)

Blue Note 1500 series (10 inch 78 rpm)
 BN 1564 "I Mean You" (BN331-1) / "Symphonette" (BN334-1) ["Symphonette" not recorded by Monk; Tadd Dameron performance]
 BN 1565 "Who Knows" (BN320-0) / "Monk's Mood" (BN319-0) 
 BN 1575 "April in Paris" (BN315-1) / "Nice Work If You Can Get It" (BN312-1)
 BN 1589 "Four in One" (BN392-1) / "Straight, No Chaser" (BN395-1)
 BN 1590 "Criss Cross" (BN393-0) / "Eronel" (BN394-0)
 BN 1591 "Ask Me Now" (BN396-1) / "Willow Weep for Me" (BN397-0)
 BN 1602 "Skippy" (BN434-1 tk.2) / "Let's Cool One" (BN438-0 tk.11)
 BN 1603 "Hornin' In" (BN435-3 tk.7) / "Carolina Moon" (BN437-0 tk.10)

Blue Note 1600 series (7 inch 45 rpm)
 BN 45-1664 "'Round About Midnight" (BN321-1) / "In Walked Bud" (BN318-3)
 BN 45-1646 "Lillie" [Milt Jackson] (BN423-1 tk.4) / "Willow Weep for Me" (BN397-0) [credited to Milt Jackson]

1951-1952 series of 10-inch LPs

Genius of Modern Music (Blue Note LP 5002, 1951)
Side 1:
'Round Midnight (as "Round About Midnight")
Off Minor
Ruby, My Dear
I Mean You
Side 2:
Thelonious
Epistrophy
Well, You Needn't
Misterioso
The original 10" release does not include any recordings made after 1948.

Genius of Modern Music Vol. 2 (Blue Note LP 5009, 1952) 
Side 1:
Four in One
Who Knows?
Nice Work if You Can Get It
In Walked Bud
Side 2:
Humph
Straight, No Chaser
Suburban Eyes
Ask Me Now
The original 10" release does not include any recordings from Monk's May 30, 1952 Blue Note session, which may indicate that the album was prepared (and maybe released) before that session took place.

Milt Jackson, Wizard of the Vibes (Blue Note LP 5011, 1952)

Side 1:
Tahiti	
Lillie	
Criss-Cross	
Willow Weep for Me
Side 2:	
What's New?
Bags' Groove	
On the Scene	
Eronel
Tracks A1-A2, B1-B3 are from an April 7, 1952 session which does not feature Thelonious Monk.

1956 Series of 12 inch LPs (monochrome photo covers)

Milt Jackson and the Thelonious Monk Quintet (Blue Note BLP-1509, 1956)

Side 1:
Lillie	
Tahiti	
What's New?	
Bags' Groove	
On the Scene	
Willow, Weep for Me
Side 2:	
Criss Cross	
Eronel	
Misterioso (Alternate Master)	
Evidence	
Lillie (Alternate Master)	
Four in One (Alternate Master)
Tracks A1-A5, B5 are from an April 7, 1952 session which does not feature Thelonious Monk.
This LP marked the first release of the alternate takes of "Misterioso" and "Four In One."

Genius of Modern Music Volume One (Blue Note BLP-1510, 1956, yellow cover)

Side 1:
'Round Midnight (as "Round About Midnight")
Off Minor
Ruby my Dear
I Mean You
April in Paris
In Walked Bud
Side 2:
Thelonious
Epistrophy
Misterioso
Well You Needn't
Introspection
Humph
This LP marked the first release of "Introspection."

Genius of Modern Music Volume Two (Blue Note BLP-1511, 1956, red cover)

Carolina Moon (Joe Burke, Benny Davis)
Hornin' In
Skippy
Let's Cool One
Suburban Eyes 	(Ike Quebec)
Evonce (Ike Quebec, Idrees Sulieman)
Side 2:
Straight, No Chaser
Four in One
Nice Work (If You Can Get It) (G. Gershwin, I. Gershwin)
Monk's Mood
Who Knows?
Ask Me Now

1989 CD Recompilations
These CD releases use the cover art of the 1956 twelve inch LPs, but redistribute the performances between the volumes into a strict chronological order, with alternate takes immediately following the first-released takes.

A 2-CD set called The Complete Genius, featuring the 1956 yellow cover art, includes all of the Blue Note sessions (including July 2, 1948), ordered in a similar manner.

Genius of Modern Music Volume One (uses 1956 yellow cover)
Humph
Evonce (alternate take)
Evonce
Suburban Eyes
Suburban Eyes (alternate take)
Thelonious
Nice Work If You Can Get It (alternate take)
Nice Work If You Can Get It
Ruby, My Dear (alternate take)
Ruby, My Dear
Well, You Needn't
Well, You Needn't (alternate take)
April in Paris (alternate take)
April in Paris
Off Minor
Introspection
In Walked Bud
Monk's Mood
Who Knows
'Round Midnight
Who Knows  (alternate take)

1-6 recorded Oct 15, 1947
7-16 recorded Oct 24 1947
17-21 recorded Nov 21, 1947

Milt Jackson and the Thelonious Monk Quintet (uses 1956 red cover)
Tahiti
Lillie
Lillie
Bags' Groove
What's New?
What's New?
Don't Get Around Much Anymore
Don't Get Around Much Anymore
On the Scene
Evidence
Misterioso
Misterioso
Epistrophy
I Mean You
All the Things You Are
I Should Care
I Should Care

10-17 recorded July 2, 1948
1-9 are from an April 7, 1952 session which does not feature Thelonious Monk.

Genius of Modern Music Volume Two (uses 1956 red cover)
Four in One
Four in One (alternate take)
Criss Cross
Criss Cross (alternate take)
Eronel
Straight, No Chaser
Ask Me Now  (alternate take)
Ask Me Now
Willow Weep for Me
Skippy
Skippy  (alternate take)
Hornin' In  (alternate take)
Hornin' In
Sixteen (first take)
Sixteen (second take)
Carolina Moon
Let's Cool One
I'll Follow You

1-9 recorded July 23, 1951
10-18 recorded May 30, 1952

2001 CD Recompilations
The sessions were recompiled, under the same title, on CD in 2001 as part of the RVG series, remastered by Rudy Van Gelder from the original session lacquers.  The cover art for the original 8-song 10 inch LPs was used, regardless of whether the specific tracks listed were actually included on the corresponding new volumes.  While the earlier CDs grouped all takes of each title together, the recompilation put the alternate takes at the end of each session.

The July 2, 1948 session was released on Blue Note CD Milt Jackson, Wizard of the Vibes, which also used its respective 1952 10-inch LP cover art.

Genius of Modern Music Vol. 1 (2001)
Humph
Evonce
Suburban Eyes
Thelonious
Evonce (alternate take)
Suburban Eyes (alternate take)
Nice Work If You Can Get It
Ruby, My Dear
Well, You Needn't
April in Paris
Off Minor
Introspection
Nice Work If You Can Get It (alternate take)
Ruby, My Dear (alternate take)
Well, You Needn't (alternate take)
April in Paris (alternate take)
In Walked Bud
Monk's Mood
Who Knows?
'Round Midnight
Who Knows? (alternate take)

1-6 recorded Oct 15, 1947
7-16 recorded Oct 24 1947
17-21 recorded Nov 21, 1947

Milt Jackson, Wizard of the Vibes (2001)
Tahiti	
Lillie	
Bags' Groove	
What's New
Don't Get Around Much Anymore	
On the Scene	
Lillie (alternate take)
What's New (alternate take)	
Don't Get Around Much Anymore (alternate take) 	
Evidence 	
Misterioso 	
Epistrophy	
I Mean You 	
Misterioso (alternate take)
All the Things You Are
I Should Care
I Should Care (alternate take)

10-17 recorded July 2, 1948
1-9 are from an April 7, 1952 session which does not feature Thelonious Monk.

Genius of Modern Music Vol. 2 (2001)
Four in One
Criss Cross
Eronel
Straight, No Chaser
Ask Me Now
Willow Weep for Me
Four in One (alternate take) (mislabeled as "Nice Work If You Can Get It")
Criss Cross (alternate take)
Ask Me Now (alternate take)
Skippy
Hornin' In
Sixteen (second take)
Carolina Moon
Let's Cool One
I'll Follow You
Skippy (alternate take)
Hornin' In (alternate take)
Sixteen (first take)

1-9 recorded July 23, 1951
10-18 recorded May 30, 1952

Other Compilations in Brief

The Complete Genius (Blue Note 2 LP set, BN-LA 579-H2)
1976 compilation featuring all takes released in 1940s and 1950s.
Sessions presented in this order:  3, 1, 2, 4, 6, 5.

The Complete Blue Note Recordings of Thelonious Monk (Mosaic Records 4 LP Boxed Set, MR4-101)
Limited edition 1983 set marked the first appearance of most of the alternate takes, and debuted the recordings of "Sixteen" and "I'll Follow You" from the May 30, 1952 session.  Ordering is similar to later Blue Note (Japan) 2-CD Complete Genius.

The Complete Genius (Blue Note Japan, 2 CD set) 
Similar in visual appearance and sequencing to the 1989 releases, combines Genius of Modern Music volumes 1 & 2, with the 1948 Milt Jackson section properly placed in-between.  Features the yellow Volume 1 cover from 1956.  This may only have been released by Blue Note Japan.

The Complete Blue Note Recordings of Thelonious Monk (Blue Note, 4 CD Boxed Set)
1994 compilation with similar cover to Mosaic LP set includes all takes from the six sessions, together with two tracks, "Reflections" and "Misterioso", recorded with Sonny Rollins on April 14, 1957, and the same five (of a total of seven) of the tracks recorded live at the Five Spot Café with John Coltrane in the late summer of 1958 that had previously been released as The Thelonious Monk Quartet featuring John Coltrane: Live at the Five Spot: Discovery!.

See also
 Genius of Modern Music: Volume 1
 Genius of Modern Music: Volume 2
 Milt Jackson: Wizard of the Vibes
List of compositions by Thelonious Monk

References

External links
 Covers and Liner Notes of 10" LPs:  http://www.gokudo.co.jp/Record/BlueNote1/index.htm
 Covers and Liner Notes of 12" LPs:  http://www.gokudo.co.jp/Record/BlueNote2/index.htm
 Blue Note 78 rpm series (12 inch 78 rpm) - BN 1   Meade "Lux" Lewis - Melancholy / Solitude   1939
 Blue Note Records Catalog: 45 rpm 1600 series - single index

Blue Note Records albums
 

de:Genius of Modern Music